The 2005–06 All-Ireland Intermediate Club Football Championship was the third staging of the All-Ireland Intermediate Club Football Championship since its establishment by the Gaelic Athletic Association for the 2003–04 season.

The All-Ireland final was played on 19 February 2006 at Croke Park in Dublin, between Inniskeen Grattans and Caherlistrane. Inniskeen Grattans won the match by 2-10 to 1-11 to claim their first ever championship title.

References

2005 in Irish sport
2006 in Irish sport
All-Ireland Intermediate Club Football Championship
All-Ireland Intermediate Club Football Championship